JRF may refer to:
 Jackie Robinson Foundation
 James River Freeway, in Springfield, Missouri, US
 Japan Freight Railway Company
 Jarala railway station, in Pakistan
 Jewish Reconstructionist Federation
 Jordan River Foundation
 Joseph Rowntree Foundation
 Junior research fellow, in India
 Kalaeloa Airport, in Kapolei, Hawaii, US
 Naval Air Station Barbers Point, US